Jahangir-e Olya (also Romanized as Jahāngīr-e ‘Olyā; also known as Jahāngīr) is a village in Golbibi Rural District, Marzdaran District, Sarakhs County, Razavi Khorasan Province, Iran. At the 2006 census, its population was 62, in 16 families.

References 

Populated places in Sarakhs County